Castleberry Independent School District is a public school district located in River Oaks, Texas, United States. The district's boundaries contain River Oaks and majority of the city of Sansom Park. The district covers an area around 5.438 sq mi, placing it among the smallest (in geographic size) public school districts in Texas.

In 2009, the school district was rated "academically acceptable" by the Texas Education Agency.

Schools

High school
Castleberry High School (grades 9–12)

Middle school
Irma Marsh Middle School/IMMS (grades 6–8)

Elementary schools
A.V. Cato Elementary School/A.V. Cato  (prekindergarten-grade 5) 
Castleberry Elementary School/CES (prekindergarten-grade 5)
Joy James Elementary School/JES (prekindergarten-grade 5)

Alternative schools
REACH High School (grades 9–12)
TRUCE Learning Center (grades 6–12)

Students

Academics

Local region and statewide averages on standardized tests typically exceed the average scores of students in Castleberry.  In 2015-2016 State of Texas Assessments of Academic Readiness (STAAR) results, 69% of students in Castleberry ISD met Level II Satisfactory standards, compared with 77% in Region 11 and 75% in the state. The average SAT score of the class of 2015 was 1300, and the average ACT score was 19.0.

Demographics
In the 2015–2016 school year, the school district had a total of 4,044 students, ranging from early childhood education and prekindergarten through grade 12. The class of 2015 included 188 graduates; the annual drop-out rate across grades 9-12 was 1.8%.

As of the 2015–2016 school year, the ethnic distribution of the school district was 76.7% Hispanic, 20.4% White, 1.1% African American, 0.3% American Indian, 0.2% Asian, and 1.1% from two or more races. Economically disadvantaged students made up 84.0% of the student body.

References

External links
Castleberry ISD

School districts in Tarrant County, Texas
School districts established in 1945
1945 establishments in Texas